List of Registered Historic Places in Marlborough, Massachusetts

Marlborough

|}

References

 
Marlborough
 Marlborough
Marlborough, Massachusetts